Michael Shuey (born February 2, 1994) is an American track and field athlete competing in the javelin throw. In 2019, he competed in the men's javelin throw at the 2019 World Athletics Championships in Doha, Qatar. He did not qualify to compete in the final.

Early life 

He grew up in Johnsonburg, Pennsylvania, United States.

Career 

In 2019, he competed in the men's javelin throw at the Pan American Games held in Lima, Peru. He finished in 4th place.

He has qualified to represent the United States at the 2020 Summer Olympics.

See also
 List of Pennsylvania State University Olympians

References

External links 
 

Living people
1994 births
American male javelin throwers
World Athletics Championships athletes for the United States
Pan American Games track and field athletes for the United States
Athletes (track and field) at the 2019 Pan American Games
USA Outdoor Track and Field Championships winners
Sportspeople from Pennsylvania
Athletes (track and field) at the 2020 Summer Olympics
Olympic track and field athletes of the United States
Penn State Nittany Lions men's track and field athletes